The Sequoia Falco is an Italian-designed lightweight 2-seater aerobatic aircraft.

Design and development
The aircraft was designed by the renowned Italian designer Stelio Frati in 1955, with the prototype, powered by a  Continental C-90 engine, flying for the first time on 15 June 1955. The prototype was soon re-engined with a  Lycoming O-290-D2B, forming the basis for the initial production batch. It was originally built in Italy by Aviamilano then Aeromere and later Laverda. 

The aircraft is single-engined, propeller driven and designed for private and general aviation use.  The Falco was sold in kit or plans form for amateur construction by the Sequoia Aircraft Company of Richmond, Virginia until its closure in 2014.

The design was adopted in the US in the 1980s and converted to kit form. The aircraft is widely considered to be one of the best handling, strongest, and most aesthetically pleasing designs ever made available to home builders.

Performance includes a 175 knot cruise speed and 6g aerobatic capability.

The Sequoia Falco F8L is constructed of spruce and typically Finnish birch plywood. The structure is built from laminated spruce bulkheads and the birch plywood is used for the skin. The plywood is often softened with hot steam, formed over the various structures and glued in place. The aircraft is rated for 6g positive and 3g negative.

Reviewers Roy Beisswenger and Marino Boric described the design in a 2015 review as "a complex all-wooden construction in spruce and plywood and is therefore time-consuming  to build. But the results in terms of weight and speed are remarkable., so much so that the Falco is considered a classic, with outstanding performance and handling."

Variants
F.8L Series I Initial production model powered by 101 kW (135 hp) Lycoming engine.  Ten built by Aviamilano starting in 1956.
F.8L Series II Improved model built by Aviamilano, with 112 kW (150 hp) engine. Twenty built.
F.8L Series III (Also known as F.8L America) Modified version of Series II built by Aeromere in conformance with US airworthiness requirements. 35 built by Aeromere.
Super Falco Series IV Similar to America, but with more powerful engine ( Lycoming O-320-B3) and constant speed propeller.  Built by Laverda. Twenty built.
Sequoia Falco Similar to the production aircraft but re-designed for homebuilding from kits or plans, by Alfred Scott of Sequoia Aircraft Company and David Thurston of Lake Buccaneer fame.

Specifications (Laverda Super Falco Series IV)

See also
Aermacchi SF.260 (military trainer designed by Frati)
PAC CT/4 (Pacific Aerospace Limited)

Notes

References

External links

 Sequoia's site
 Falco Kit Company Article

1950s Italian sport aircraft
Falco, Sequoia
Falco
Low-wing aircraft
Falco
Aerobatic aircraft
Single-engined tractor aircraft
Aircraft first flown in 1955